Capobula is a genus of southern African spiders in the family Trachelidae. The type species was first described by Eugène Simon from a juvenile found in South Africa. It was placed with Orthobula for several morphological similarities, including a large sclerite beneath the abdomen and spines behind several of the legs. After a more thorough examination in 2021, including both male and female adults, enough distinctive features were found in the holotype and several other newly discovered species to warrant a new genus.

Species
 it contains five species:
C. capensis Haddad, Jin, Platnick & Booysen, 2021 – South Africa
C. infima (Simon, 1896) (type) – South Africa
C. montana Haddad, Jin, Platnick & Booysen, 2021 – South Africa, Lesotho
C. neethlingi Haddad, Jin, Platnick & Booysen, 2021 – South Africa
C. ukhahlamba Haddad, Jin, Platnick & Booysen, 2021 – South Africa

See also
 Orthobula
 List of Trachelidae species

References

Trachelidae genera
Taxa named by Norman I. Platnick
Spiders of Africa